Alexander, Duke of Schleswig-Holstein-Sonderburg, (20 January 157313 May 1627) was a Danish nobleman.

Alexander was born in Sønderborg (German: Sonderburg) in Schleswig, the third son of John II, Duke of Schleswig-Holstein-Sonderburg and Elisabeth of Brunswick-Grubenhagen. Because his elder surviving brother chose Ærø as his seat, Alexander received Sønderborg upon their father's death and was in practice its second duke. Alexander died in Sønderborg.

Marriage and issue
Alexander married Dorothea of Schwarzburg-Sondershausen, daughter of John Günther I, Count of Schwarzburg-Sondershausen, on 26 November 1604 in Oldenburg.  They had eleven children:

 John Christian (26 April 1607 – 28 June 1653)
 Alexander Henry (12 September 1608 – 5 September 1657)
 Ernest Günther (14 October 1609 – 18 January 1689)
 George Frederick (18 December 1611 – 23 August 1676)
 August Philipp (11 November 1612 – 6 May 1675)
 Adolph (2 November 1613 – 1 February 1616), died young
 Anna Elisabeth (5 February 1615 – 19 February 1616), died young
 William Anton (2 April 1616 – 2 April 1616), died soon after birth
 Sophie Katharina (28 June 1617 – 22 November 1696), wife of Anthony Günther, Count of Oldenburg
 Eleonore Sabine (27 February 1619 – 27 February 1619), died soon after birth
 Philip Louis (27 October 1620 – 10 March 1689)

Ancestors 

1573 births
1627 deaths
Dukes of Germany
House of Oldenburg in Schleswig-Holstein
People from Augustenborg, Denmark